Natalie Burton (born 23 March 1989) is an Australian basketball player and coach. She is currently the assistant coach for the Perth Lynx of the Women's National Basketball League (WNBL). She represented the Australian national team and was a regular with the Perry Lakes Hawks of the NBL1 West until 2021.

Junior career
Burton made her debut for the Perry Lakes Hawks in the State Basketball League (SBL) in 2006, going on to win the Most Improved Player award in 2008. Between 2008 and 2012, she played college basketball in the United States for the West Virginia Mountaineers. She averaged 2.8 points and 2.6 rebounds in 119 games, with her 52.8 career field goal percentage ranking her as the second best in West Virginia history. She graduated in May 2012 with a degree in finance.

West Virginia statistics

Source

Professional career
Following her graduation from West Virginia University, Burton returned to her hometown of Perth and signed with the West Coast Waves for the 2012–13 WNBL season. After averaging 8.1 points and 5.4 rebounds in 24 games over her rookie season, she recommitted to the Waves for the 2013–14 season. In her second season, she averaged 6.8 points and 4.7 rebounds in 17 games. During this time, she played for the Perry Lakes Hawks in 2012 and 2013.

After playing for the BA Centre of Excellence during the 2014 SEABL season, Burton joined the Melbourne Boomers for the 2014–15 WNBL season. In 22 games for the Boomers, she averaged 7.0 points and 5.1 rebounds per game.

On 17 April 2015, Burton signed with the Perth Lynx, a day after the rebranding of her former team the West Coast Waves. She helped the Lynx reach the WNBL Grand Final in 2016, where they lost 2–0 to the Townsville Fire. She appeared in all 27 games for the Lynx in 2015–16, averaging 6.0 points and 5.1 rebounds per game.

On 27 May 2016, Burton re-signed with the Perth Lynx for the 2016–17 WNBL season. On 25 November 2016, she played her 100th WNBL game.

In 2017, Burton played for the Perry Lakes Hawks and helped them win the SBL championship.

On 31 August 2017, Burton re-signed with the Perth Lynx for the 2017–18 WNBL season. On 17 November 2017, Burton played her 100th game with the franchise, becoming the eleventh player in team history to do so.

After once again playing for the Hawks in 2018, Burton moved to Germany for the 2018–19 season to play for Herner TC. There she won the DBBL championship. After playing an eighth season with the Hawks in 2019, she returned to Europe for the 2019–20 season, this time playing for French team Union Saint-Amand Porte du Hainaut. After playing with the Hawks during the 2020 West Coast Classic, she played for the Sydney Uni Flames during the 2020 WNBL Hub season in Queensland. She had her tenth stint with the Hawks during the 2021 NBL1 West season.

In December 2021, Burton signed with the Warwick Senators for the 2022 NBL1 West season, ending her long-time association with the Perry Lakes Hawks.

National team career
Burton represented Australia at the 2013 World University Games in Russia, where they lost to Team USA in the semifinals. Burton scored four points in the semifinal. Australia went on to win the bronze medal game. Later in 2013, Burton helped the Australian Opals win the gold medal at the FIBA Oceania Championship. In 2014, she won another bronze medal with the Opals, this time at the FIBA World Championship. She won another gold medal with the Opals at the 2015 FIBA Oceania Championship.

Coaching career
In September 2021, Burton was appointed assistant coach of the Perth Lynx for the 2021–22 WNBL season.

Personal
Burton's younger sister, Emily, is also a basketball player and was a member of the 2017 Hawks championship team.

References

External links

FIBA.com profile
Basketball Australia profile
WNBL profile

1989 births
Living people
Australian expatriate basketball people in the United States
Australian women's basketball players
Basketball players at the 2016 Summer Olympics
Basketball players from Perth, Western Australia
Centers (basketball)
Medalists at the 2013 Summer Universiade
Melbourne Boomers players
Olympic basketball players of Australia
Perth Lynx players
Power forwards (basketball)
Universiade bronze medalists for Australia
Universiade medalists in basketball
West Virginia Mountaineers women's basketball players